HD 203857 is a double star in the constellation Cygnus. It is near the lower limit of visibility to the naked eye, having a combined apparent visual magnitude of 6.46. The distance to the primary component is approsimatly 1,230 light years based on parallax, and it has an absolute magnitude of −0.75. The star is drifting closer to the Sun with a radial velocity of −6.3 km/s. It has a stellar classification of K5 and is known to be evolved.  The star likely hosts an extrasolar planet, though yet unconfirmed.

HD 203857 is listed in the Washington Double Star Catalogue as having five visual companions. It is separated by six arc-minutes from HD 203784, an F-type subgiant, though it is likely they are actually not gravitationally–bound. HD 203784 is thought to be closer to us and less luminous than HD 203857. HD 203784 has a 13th-magnitude star and a 14th-magnitude star within .

Substellar companion

Okayama Planet Search team has published a paper in late 2008 reporting investigations on radial velocity variations observed for a set of evolved stars, announcing possible detection of a substellar companion orbiting the giant star HD 203857. Orbital period is estimated 2.3 years, but planet has still to be confirmed.

References

External links
 http://exoplanet.eu/star.php?st=HD%20203857

K-type giants
Hypothetical planetary systems
Double stars
Cygnus (constellation)
Durchmusterung objects
203857
105637
8193